Ricania is a genus of planthoppers belonging to the family Ricaniidae.

Species 
Species within this genus include:

 Ricania apicalis
 Ricania atra
 Ricania aurora
 Ricania berezovskii
 Ricania bicolorata
 Ricania binotata
 Ricania burgeoni
 Ricania caliginosa
 Ricania cervina
 Ricania confusa
 Ricania congoensis
 Ricania consanguinea
 Ricania coorgensis
 Ricania corusca
 Ricania costimacula
 Ricania depressicollis
 Ricania episcopalis
 Ricania episcopus
 Ricania erlangeri
 Ricania eximia
 Ricania fenestrata
 Ricania flavifrontalis
 Ricania fumosa
 Ricania fusca
 Ricania fusconebulosa
 Ricania fuscula
 Ricania geometra
 Ricania guttata
 Ricania hedenborgi
 Ricania hewitti
 Ricania impervia
 Ricania indicata
 Ricania insularis
 Ricania japonica
 Ricania keiseri
 Ricania laratica
 Ricania limbata
 Ricania luctuosa
 Ricania lujai
 Ricania lukuluensis
 Ricania lurida
 Ricania lutescens
 Ricania malandae
 Ricania marginalis
 Ricania marginenotata
 Ricania minbuensis
 Ricania mitescens
 Ricania moluccana
 Ricania morula
 Ricania nigra
 Ricania nigrita
 Ricania noctua
 Ricania obliqua
 Ricania papuana
 Ricania pedicellata
 Ricania plagiata
 Ricania plebeja
 Ricania protea
 Ricania quadrimaculata
 Ricania quinquefasciata
 Ricania quinquepunctata
 Ricania rubrifascia
 Ricania sigillata
 Ricania simulans
 Ricania sobrina
 Ricania speculum
 Ricania striata
 Ricania stupida
 Ricania suasa
 Ricania subacta
 Ricania subglauca
 Ricania sutteri
 Ricania taeniata
 Ricania tisiphone
 Ricania trifasciata
 Ricania venustula
 Ricania zebra
 Ricania zigzac

References

Auchenorrhyncha genera
Ricaniidae